Daro is a town and sub-prefecture in the Macenta Prefecture in the Nzérékoré Region of southeastern Guinea near the border of Liberia.

References

Sub-prefectures of the Nzérékoré Region